The 1916 United States presidential election in Oklahoma took place on November 7, 1916, as part of the 1916 United States presidential election.

Background and vote
In its early years, Oklahoma was a “Solid South” Democratic state whose founding fathers like "Alfalfa Bill" Murray and Charles N. Haskell had disfranchised most of its black population via literacy tests and grandfather clauses, the latter of which would be declared unconstitutional in Guinn v. United States. Partly owing to the absence of the poll taxes found in other Southern states due to the strength of populism amongst the state’s white settlers, the state became a stronghold of the Socialist Party in the 1910s, especially in the southeast and the northwestern Plains.

Oklahoma voters overwhelmingly voted for Democratic incumbent Wilson, over the Republican nominee, Associate Justice Charles Evans Hughes.

Despite a strong showing from the Socialist candidate Allan L. Benson, the state was won handily by President Wilson. He garnered 50.65 percent of the vote, compared to Justice Hughes who won 33.25 percent of the vote. Wilson carries the state by a margin of 17.4 percent. Oklahoma proved to be the best showing for Benson of any state in this election, where he gained 15.45 percent the vote.

This election continued the Democratic trend in the state. Oklahoma would only vote Republican in the elections of 1920 and 1928 until the trend flipped after the 1952 presidential election.

Results

Results by county

See also
 United States presidential elections in Oklahoma

Notes

References

Oklahoma
1916
1916 Oklahoma elections